Robert Lee (March 10, 1862 – August 5, 1925) was a politician in Alberta, Canada and a mayor of Edmonton.

Biography

Lee was born in Lanark County, Ontario, on March 10, 1862, and graduated from the Dominion Business College in Kingston. He married Annette Wilson, with whom he had a daughter and two sons, in 1897. He served as a member of the Lanark City Council from 1892 until 1898, after which he moved to Edmonton. He was in partnership with John Ross in grain trading, insurance, and loans under the name Ross & Lee until 1902, after which he partnered with W I Crafts in real estate, timber, and coal mining under the name Crafts & Lee (another partner was admitted in 1905 as they became Crafts, Lee & Gallinger). He served on the public school board from 1902 until 1904.

He first sought municipal office in 1907, when he was elected to a two-year term as alderman on Edmonton City Council, finishing fourth of twelve candidates in an election in which the top five candidates were elected. He resigned midway through his term to run for mayor in the 1908 election, when he defeated Thomas Bellamy by 1303 votes to 639. He was re-elected in 1909, defeating Robert Manson, but did not seek re-election in 1910 and stayed out of municipal politics thereafter.

In 1905 he erected the Lee Block on the corner of Jasper Avenue and Second Street (102 Street). The building housed, among other businesses, Reed's Bazaar. It was destroyed by fire in 1913 but a reconstruction of the building now stands at Fort Edmonton Park. He was active with the Presbyterian Church and the Liberal Party of Alberta.

Robert Lee died August 5, 1925.

References
Edmonton Public Library Biography of Robert Lee
City of Edmonton biography of Robert Lee

1862 births
1925 deaths
Mayors of Edmonton
People from Lanark County
Canadian Presbyterians
19th-century Canadian politicians
20th-century Canadian politicians